Joan Frances Harnett-Kindley  (née Martin; born 24 February 1943) is a New Zealand former netball player and real estate agent. She began playing for Canterbury's Sacred Hart team in 1960 and was first selected to play for the country's national squad in 1963. Harnett played in three editions of the World Netball Championships in 1963, 1967 and 1971 and was named player of the tournament of the 1967 competition that New Zealand won. She stopped playing internationally in 1971 and retired three years later. Harnett played in 116 international matches and was captain for 45 of them. took up a career in the real estate industry from 1972 to about 2007, serving as a member of various committees and was an inaugural member of the Real Estate Authority. Harnett is an inductee of the New Zealand Sports Hall of Fame and was named a Sporting Legend of Canterbury in 2007.

Early life and career
Harnett was born on 24 February 1943. Growing up in New Zealand, Harnett spent some of her childhood in Dunedin. She also lived in Blenheim and Christchurch during her youth. Her mother was a hockey player for Southland and also played basketball. Harnett played basketball until she was 12 years old. Other sports that Harnett played in school included tennis and netball. Upon finishing school, she began playing netball for the Sacred Hart team (now known as Hearts) in Canterbury in 1960 and was selected for the 1963 New Zealand national netball team trials. Harnett was part of the New Zealand squad that contested the 1963 World Netball Championships in England, where the team finished runners-up to the Australian side by a single goal. For the 1967 World Netball Championships in Perth, she and the rest of the New Zealand team trained for ten days in Christchurch. At the time, Harnett was working in a bank and practised shooting at break times. She recalls taking unpaid leave to frequently do fundraising for the squad. New Zealand went on to win the competition and Harnett's performance throughout meant she was voted player of the tournament.

She was named captain of the New Zealand side for the 1971 World Netball Championships in Jamaica. The team went on to finish runners-up behind Australia for the second time. Harnett stopped playing for the national team in 1971, and retired outright in 1974. She said she retired because she did not want to fail and had "always been an achiever. I've always liked to succeed." She had played for the New Zealand national team 26 times in World Championship competition and earned 116 caps overall; a total of 45 caps were when Harnett was captain. Harnett went on to coach the Canterbury team for two years after the regular coach Cath Brown became unwell, finishing first and second in the provincial tournament. She wrote a column for the national newspaper Truth as she was coaching; Harnett enjoyed writing a column because she liked voicing her views on issues important to her. In 1996, she declined an offer to coach the Dunedin University side that had been demoted from the A to the B grade because she no longer wanted to coach.

In 1972, Harnett began a career in the real estate industry and at first assigned appointments around her netball matches. She went on to establish Joan Harnett Real Estate fifteen years later. In 1995, Harnett left the business and moved to Dunedin. She was the first female to be awarded both the Fellowship and Life Membership to the Real Estate Institute of New Zealand in 2003. She was a member of the Canterbury-Westland District Real Estate Executive Committee, the Canterbury-Westland and Otago District Committee presidents and was an inaugural member of the Real Estate Authority. Harnett was a judge to determine the Master Builders House of the Year and is a patron of the New Zealand Masters Games. She is a member of the Board of Governors of the New Zealand Sports Hall of Fame. By 2007, Harnett had left the real estate industry.

Personal life
She was married for seven years to sportsperson Joe Harnett and had a son with him. She remarried in 1995 to former boxer and tennis player Don Kindley. For the 2020 Birthday Honours in June of that year, she was appointed Officer of the New Zealand Order of Merit (ONZM) "for services to netball and the real estate industry."

Profile
She played variously in the Wing Attack, Goal Attack and Goal Shooter positions. During Harnett's netball career, she received press attention for her photogenic appearance, and had less focus on her achievements. The media variously described her as "a long legged beauty", "the male's ideal sportswomen" and "the essence of femininity". Harnett is however credited with changing the perception of how netball is viewed in New Zealand, during a time when women's sport received little coverage from the nation's media. She has been said to "have redefined the scope and skill of the shooting positions, with her ability to read the game and instinctive play." according to Bridget Tunnicliffe of Radio New Zealand.

Honours
In 1990, she was added to the sporting category of the New Zealand Sports Hall of Fame. A panel of experts named Harnett the goal attack in their "Dream Team" as part of the 75th Anniversary of Netball New Zealand in 1999, and was voted New Zealand's Netball Player of the Century in June 2000. She was one of two first sportspeople to be named to the Sporting Legends of Canterbury at the Sport Canterbury Winter Awards in late 2007.

References

1943 births
Living people
20th-century New Zealand women
21st-century New Zealand women
New Zealand netball players
New Zealand international netball players
New Zealand netball coaches
New Zealand real estate agents
Officers of the New Zealand Order of Merit
1963 World Netball Championships players
1967 World Netball Championships players
1971 World Netball Championships players